The following outline is provided as an overview of and topical guide to the U.S. state of West Virginia:

West Virginia – U.S. state located in the Appalachian region of the Southern United States. West Virginia became a state following the Wheeling Conventions of 1861, in which 50 northwestern counties of Virginia decided to break away from Virginia during the American Civil War. The state is noted for its mountains and rolling hills, its historically significant logging and coal mining industries, and its political and labor history.

General reference 

 Names
 Common name: West Virginia
 Pronunciation: 
 Official name: State of West Virginia
 Abbreviations and name codes
 Postal symbol:  WV
 ISO 3166-2 code: US-WV
 Internet second-level domain: .wv.us
 Nicknames
 Mountain State (previously used on license plates)
 Panhandle State
 Adjectivals: West Virginia, West Virginian
 Demonym: West Virginian, Mountaineer

Geography of West Virginia 

Geography of West Virginia
 West Virginia is: a U.S. state, a federal state of the United States of America
 Location
 Northern hemisphere
 Western hemisphere
 Americas
 North America
 Anglo America
 Northern America
 United States of America
 Contiguous United States
 Eastern United States
 Mid-Atlantic states
 Southeastern United States
 Southern United States
 Population of West Virginia: 1,852,994  (2010 U.S. Census)
 Area of West Virginia
 Atlas of West Virginia

Places in West Virginia 

 Historic places in West Virginia
 National Historic Landmarks in West Virginia
 National Register of Historic Places listings in West Virginia
 Bridges on the National Register of Historic Places in West Virginia
 National Natural Landmarks in West Virginia
 National parks in West Virginia
 State parks in West Virginia

Environment of West Virginia 
 Climate of West Virginia
 Geology of West Virginia
 Protected areas in West Virginia
 State forests of West Virginia
 Superfund sites in West Virginia
 Wildlife of West Virginia
 Fauna of West Virginia
 Birds of West Virginia
 Mammals of West Virginia
 Reptiles of West Virginia
 Amphibians of West Virginia

Natural geographic features of West Virginia 
 Islands of West Virginia
 Lakes of West Virginia
 Rivers of West Virginia

Regions of West Virginia 

 Eastern Panhandle of West Virginia
 North Central West Virginia
 Northern Panhandle of West Virginia
 Southern West Virginia

Administrative divisions of West Virginia 

 The 55 counties of the state of West Virginia
 Municipalities in West Virginia
 Cities in West Virginia
 State capital of West Virginia:
 City nicknames in West Virginia
 Towns in West Virginia
 Census-designated places in West Virginia

Demography of West Virginia 

Demographics of West Virginia

Government and politics of West Virginia 

Politics of West Virginia
 Form of government: U.S. state government
 United States congressional delegations from West Virginia
 West Virginia State Capitol
 Political party strength in West Virginia

Branches of the government of West Virginia 

Government of West Virginia

Executive branch of the government of West Virginia 
Governor of West Virginia
Lieutenant Governor of West Virginia
 Secretary of State of West Virginia
 State departments
 West Virginia Department of Transportation

Legislative branch of the government of West Virginia 

 West Virginia Legislature (bicameral)
 Upper house: West Virginia Senate
 Lower house: West Virginia House of Delegates

Judicial branch of the government of West Virginia 

Courts of West Virginia
 Supreme Court of West Virginia

Law and order in West Virginia 

Law of West Virginia
 Cannabis in West Virginia
 Capital punishment  in West Virginia
 Constitution of West Virginia
 Crime in West Virginia
 Gun laws in West Virginia
 Law enforcement in West Virginia
 Law enforcement agencies in West Virginia
 West Virginia State Police
 Same-sex marriage in West Virginia

Military in West Virginia 

 West Virginia Air National Guard
 West Virginia Army National Guard

History of West Virginia 

History of West Virginia

History of West Virginia, by period 

Prehistory of West Virginia
English Colony of Virginia, 1607–1707
French colony of Louisiane, 1699–1764
British Colony of Virginia, 1707–1776
History of slavery in West Virginia
French and Indian War, 1754–1763
Treaty of Fontainebleau of 1762
Treaty of Paris of 1763
British Indian Reserve, 1763–1783
Royal Proclamation of 1763
American Revolutionary War, April 19, 1775 – September 3, 1783
United States Declaration of Independence, July 4, 1776
Treaty of Paris, September 3, 1783
Commonwealth of Virginia, (1776–1863)
Separation of Kentucky from Virginia in 1792
State of West Virginia becomes 35th State admitted to the United States of America on June 20, 1863
Separation of West Virginia from Virginia in 1863
American Civil War, April 12, 1861 – May 13, 1865
West Virginia in the American Civil War
Border state, 1863–1865

History of West Virginia, by subject 
 History of slavery in West Virginia
 West Virginia in the American Civil War

Culture of West Virginia 

Culture of West Virginia
 Museums in West Virginia
 Religion in West Virginia
 Episcopal Diocese of West Virginia
 Scouting in West Virginia
 Sports in West Virginia
 State symbols of West Virginia
 Flag of the State of West Virginia 
 Great Seal of the State of West Virginia

The arts in West Virginia 
 Music of West Virginia

Economy and infrastructure of West Virginia 

Economy of West Virginia
 Communications in West Virginia
 Newspapers in West Virginia
 Radio stations in West Virginia
 Television stations in West Virginia
 Energy in West Virginia
 Power stations in West Virginia
 Solar power in West Virginia
 Wind power in West Virginia
 Health care in West Virginia
 Hospitals in West Virginia
 Transportation in West Virginia
 Airports in West Virginia
 Roads in West Virginia
 U.S. Highways in West Virginia
 Interstate Highways in West Virginia
 State highways in West Virginia

Education in West Virginia 
Education in West Virginia
 Schools in West Virginia
 School districts in West Virginia
 High schools in West Virginia
 Colleges and universities in West Virginia
 West Virginia University
 West Virginia State University

See also

Topic overview:
West Virginia

Index of West Virginia-related articles

References

External links 

West Virginia
West Virginia
West Virginia